Butyriboletus autumniregius is a pored mushroom  in the family Boletaceae. It is found in California, where it fruits under Douglas fir and redwood.

See also
List of North American boletes

References

External links

autumniregius
Fungi described in 2014
Fungi of the United States
Fungi without expected TNC conservation status